Ludovine de La Rochère (born 17 January 1971) is a French activist. She is president and co-founder of La Manif pour tous.

Biographical information

Personal life 
Ludovine de la Rochère was brought up in Paris. She is a practicing Catholic, but attended non-religious public school. She went on to obtain a degree in medieval history. She then taught geography at a secondary school in Essonne, before quitting teaching in the 1990s.

De la Rochère was described as having "traditional religious convictions" by a former boss. She was married by 21 and had her first child at age 23. She has four children.

La Manif pour tous 
In 2003, de la Rochère joined the communications team of the Bishops' Conference of France, where she met Frigide Barjot. Together, they and Albéric Dumont decided to found La Manif pour tous to fight against a law enabling same-sex couples to get married in France. Before this, de la Rochère had only ever protested once before, and was described as someone who had "showed no interest in political activism". After internal disagreements, Barjot left the group and de la Rochère took over as spokesperson for the movement. She has described La Manif pour tous as an "apolitical, non-denominational and non-homophobic" movement.

Political views 
De la Rochère is opposed to same-sex marriage and civil partnerships between same-sex couples. She has stated publicly that "two people of the same sex cannot create a family together". In 2014, de la Rochère falsely claimed that 90% of female same-sex couples and 70% of male same-sex couples in Belgium end up getting divorced.

De la Rochère has voiced her opposition to surrogacy, comparing it to a "modern version of trafficking". She believes that men and women are "equal and different", and has denounced the "gender ideology", which she claims has made children confused about their gender identity. She also more recently opposed the extension of assisted reproductive technology to single women and lesbian couples.

References

External links 

1971 births
Living people

French Roman Catholics
French women activists
Politicians from Paris
Right-wing politicians in France
20th-century French women politicians
21st-century French women politicians
French anti-same-sex-marriage activists